Gareth Murray (born 23 September 1984) is a Scottish former professional  basketball player and head coach for Caledonia Gladiators, born in Arbroath. He also serves as the Gladiators current head coach.

Professional career
Murray started his career with the Scottish Rocks in 2006. Murray has also played for fellow British Basketball League clubs Cheshire Phoenix and 2010-11 and 2014-15 as well as Plymouth Raiders also in 2014–15.  Murray has also taken his talents over the channel with NM1 clubs Vendee Challans in 2014-15 and Angers BC in 2015–16.

National team career
Murray earned his first call-up to the Great Britain men's national basketball team in 2013. He has since featured in all of Great Britain's major tournaments and qualifying campaigns including FIBA Eurobasket 2013 and FIBA Eurobasket 2017. During that time, Murray has established a reputation as one of the National Team's finest marksmen with a national team career three-point field goal percentage of 0.407 (55/135) as of 24 February 2020.

Coaching career
On 16 July 2020, Murray was announced as the Rocks' player-coach.

Club statistics

Career statistics

|-
|style="text-align:left;"|2008-09
|style="text-align:left;"|Scottish Rocks
|34 ||34 || ||41.3 ||34.3 ||86.2 ||4.6 ||1.7 ||1.3 ||0.2 ||13.8 
|- 
|style="text-align:left;"|2009-10
|style="text-align:left;"|Glasgow Rocks
|35 ||35 ||32.8 ||43.1 ||30.1 ||72.6 ||5.1 ||2 ||1 ||0.4 ||10.9 
|-
|style="text-align:left;"|2010-11
|style="text-align:left;"|Cheshire Jets
|33 ||33 ||33.0 ||43.4 ||41.5 ||67.8 ||4.8 ||2.2 ||1.7 ||0.4 ||10.8 
|-
|style="text-align:left;"|2011-12
|style="text-align:left;"|Glasgow Rocks
|30 ||25 ||34.6 ||42.2 ||32 ||67.9 ||5.2 ||2.7 ||1 ||0.4 ||12.9 
|-
|style="text-align:left;"|2012-13
|style="text-align:left;"|Glasgow Rocks
|33 ||26 ||32.8 ||43 ||35 ||86'2 ||6 ||3.1 ||1.1 ||0.3 ||12.2 
|-
|style="text-align:left;"|2013-14
|style="text-align:left;"|Glasgow Rocks
|33 ||30 ||32.9 ||39.4 ||32.8 ||80.6 ||4.3 ||3.1 ||1 ||0.4 ||12'6 
|-
|style="text-align:left;"|2014
|style="text-align:left;"|Vendee Challans
| || || || || || ||||||||||
|-
|style="text-align:left;"|2014
|style="text-align:left;"|Cheshire Phoenix
|4 ||3 ||35.2 ||37 ||39.3 ||100 ||5.5 ||2.5 ||0.5 ||0.3 ||11.5
|-
|style="text-align:left;"|2015
|style="text-align:left;"|Plymouth Raiders
|18 ||14 ||34.5 ||39.9 ||27.2 ||80.6 ||6.3 ||2.9 ||1.3 ||0.4 ||10.9 
|-
|style="text-align:left;"|2015-16
|style="text-align:left;"|Angers BC
| || || || || || ||||||||||
|-
|style="text-align:left;"|2016-17
|style="text-align:left;"|Glasgow Rocks
|28 ||27 ||29.9 ||54.3 ||42.3 ||79.5 ||4.3 ||2.1 ||0.7 ||0.2 ||12.8 
|-
|style="text-align:left;"|2017-18
|style="text-align:left;"|Glasgow Rocks
|27 ||27 ||28.8 ||45.6 ||36.2 ||84.1 ||3.9 ||3.1 ||0.7 ||0.3 ||12.5
|-

References

1984 births
Living people
Basketball players at the 2018 Commonwealth Games
British expatriate basketball people in France
Cheshire Phoenix players
Glasgow Rocks players
Player-coaches
Scottish expatriate sportspeople in France
Scottish expatriate sportspeople in Malaysia
Scottish men's basketball players
Small forwards
Sportspeople from Angus, Scotland
Commonwealth Games competitors for Scotland
Scottish basketball coaches
Expatriate basketball people in Malaysia
People from Arbroath